Herwijnen is a village in the Dutch province of Gelderland. It is a part of the municipality of West Betuwe, and lies about 11 km east of Gorinchem.

Herwijnen was a separate municipality until 1986, when it was merged with Vuren, Asperen, Heukelum and Spijk as municipality of Lingewaal. Since 2019 Lingewaal merged with Geldermalsen and Neerijnen in the new municipality of West Betuwe.

History 
It was first mentioned in 850 as Heriuuinna, and means "meadow of the lord". Herwijnen developed into a stretched dike village. The Dutch Reformed Church dates from 1823. In 1840, it was home to 1,784 people.

The fort contains two bomb resistant barracks. To the west of Fort Vuren was constructed from a 1844 redoubt.

Notable people
 Patrick Vroegh (1999), football player

Gallery

Climate

References

Populated places in Gelderland
Former municipalities of Gelderland
West Betuwe